Dudley Mays Hughes (October 10, 1848 – January 20, 1927) was an American politician, farmer and railroad executive.

Hughes was born in Jeffersonville, Georgia, and attended the University of Georgia in Athens.

In 1882, Hughes was elected to the Georgia Senate and reelected the next year. From 1904 to 1906, he served as the president of the Georgia State Agricultural Society. In 1905, he became a UGA trustee and remained on that board until his death. He also served on the board of trustees for the Danville School, the Georgia State Normal Institute and the Georgia State Agricultural College.

Hughes was involved in several business including Magnolia Orchard and the Georgia Fruit Land Company. He served as president of the Georgia Fruit Growers Association. After serving as one of the original founders of the Macon, Dublin & Savannah Railroad chartered in 1885, Hughes served as its president until 1891 and as a director.

In 1906, Hughes ran as a Democrat against incumbent Elijah B. Lewis in Georgia's 3rd congressional district in the United States House of Representatives and lost. In 1908, Hughes ran against Lewis again and won. He served four consecutive terms in office; however, the Georgia General Assembly reapportioned the congressional districts in 1912, and Hughes district became Georgia's 12th congressional district. Hughes lost his bid for reelection in 1916. He returned to farming in Danville, Georgia, and died in Macon, Georgia, in 1927. He was buried in Evergreen Cemetery in Perry, Georgia.

Dudley Hughes is the namesake to the city of Dudley, Georgia.

Notes

References

Dudley Mays Hughes Collection, Richard B. Russell Library for Political Research and Studies, University of Georgia
History of the University of Georgia, Thomas Walter Reed,  Imprint:  Athens, Georgia : University of Georgia, ca. 1949, p.925
Railga.com entry for the Macon, Dublin & Savannah Railroad

External links

1848 births
1927 deaths
People from Jeffersonville, Georgia
American people of Welsh descent
Democratic Party members of the United States House of Representatives from Georgia (U.S. state)
Democratic Party Georgia (U.S. state) state senators
University of Georgia alumni
19th-century American railroad executives